Gilbert Raymond English (July 2, 1909 – August 31, 1996) was an American professional baseball third baseman. He played in Major League Baseball (MLB) for the New York Giants, Detroit Tigers, Boston Bees, and Brooklyn Dodgers between 1931 and 1944.

In 240 games over six seasons, English posted a .245 batting average (194-for-791) with 75 runs, 8 home runs, 90 RBIs and 56 bases on balls. He finished his career with a .948 fielding percentage.

References

External links

1909 births
1996 deaths
Baseball players from North Carolina
Boston Bees players
Boston Braves scouts
Bridgeport Bears (baseball) players
Brooklyn Dodgers players
Buffalo Bisons (minor league) players
California Angels scouts
Detroit Tigers players
Durham Bulls players
Indianapolis Indians players
Jersey City Skeeters players
Kansas City Blues (baseball) players
Major League Baseball third basemen
Milwaukee Braves scouts
New York Giants (NL) players
New York Yankees scouts
Portland Beavers players
St. Paul Saints (AA) players
San Francisco Giants scouts
Toledo Mud Hens players
People from Trinity, North Carolina